Sun Honglei (born 16 August 1970) is a Chinese actor.

Early life
Sun was born in Harbin, Heilongjiang, on 16 August 1970. Sun developed an interest in acting and performances at a young age. He often skipped school to learn breakdancing on the streets and eventually gave up his studies entirely to pursue dancing as a career, eventually performing with a modern dance troupe for several years. Later, Sun became a popular local nightclub singer and host before going into acting. In 1995, Sun attended the Central Academy of Drama, where he graduated in 1997. He has since gone on to star in numerous TV dramas and films, winning many awards for his stage work. Sun is probably best known to Asian cinema fans for his supporting performances in Seven Swords, Triangle and Blood Brothers. Since October 2011, Sun has played the starring role in the popular Chinese series 'Nanren Bang' (男人帮), portraying urban romantic life from a male perspective.

Acting career
In 1998, Sun played a minor character in the drama Never Close The Eye adapted from Hai Yan's novel of the same name. In 1999, Sun starred in his first film, The Road Home, and  officially entered the film industry.

Sun rose to fame for his role in the youth television series Love Story in Shanghai directed by Zhao Baogang. He gained further recognition with his role as a cold-blooded murderer in the crime drama Conquer.

Sun won his first major award at the Beijing College Student Film Festival with his role in the film Zhou Yu's Train.

In 2005, Sun co-starred in Tsui Hark's martial arts film Seven Swords.

In 2006, Sun headlined the television series Halfway Couple,  which earned high ratings and acclaimed. Sun won the Best Actor at the Shanghai Television Festival for his performance.

In 2008, Sun starred alongside Zhang Ziyi in the arthouse film Forever Enthralled.

In 2009, Sun starred in the spy war drama Lurk which was a major hit in China. The series propelled him as one of the top television actors in China, earning him Best Actor accolades at the Shanghai Television Festival, Flying Apsaras Awards and China TV Golden Eagle Award. The same year, he starred in the epic historical drama The Road We Have Taken based on the award-winning novel of the same name by Jiang Qitao; which earned high acclaim when it aired.

In 2010, Sun starred in the romantic comedy film If You Are the One 2 directed by Feng Xiaogang.

In 2011, Sun starred in the historical film The Warring States as military strategist Sun Bin.

In 2015, Sun starred in the youth film The Ark of Mr. Chow directed by Xiao Yang.

Personal life
On 1 October 2014, Sun announced he and Wang Jundi are tying the knot and the wedding was held in Paris. Their daughter was born on 16 December 2017.

Filmography

Film

Television series

Awards

References

External links
 
 Sun Honglei Biography @ LoveHKFilm.com

Male actors from Heilongjiang
1970 births
Male actors from Harbin
Living people
Central Academy of Drama alumni
Chinese male stage actors
20th-century Chinese male actors
21st-century Chinese male actors
Chinese male film actors
Chinese male television actors
Best Supporting Actor Asian Film Award winners